Vulnerable area is a term applied by the Swedish Police Authority to areas with high crime rates and social exclusion. In the December 2015 report, these areas numbered 53. In the June 2017 report, these totalled 61. The increase is reported to be due to better reporting, not a changing situation. The overall trend is that these areas are improving.

All the areas are situated south of the town of Gävle; however, only 11.4% of Sweden's total population live in the Norrland region, and most are areas constructed during the Million Programme (MP). Although there are towns north of Gävle having MP areas, they do not experience the crime rate of some southern MP areas.

In April 2019, the publication of the list by police was criticised by municipality politicians as it was stigmatising and dissuaded investors. Police responded that they saw no reason to make the list a secret, and that the list served the purpose of providing a uniform basis of evaluating districts across the country. Interior minister Morgan Johansson stated that the list will continue to be public information.

In June 2019, an update was released by police and three vulnerable areas were reclassified risk areas, two vulnerable areas were removed from the list entirely and a previously unclassified area was added as a vulnerable area. Therefore, the total number of categorised areas decreased from 61 in the 2017 report to 60 in the 2019 update.

Work on improving the areas requires cooperation with several parties like local landlords and organisations, but fear of gentrification may cause problems.

In November 2020, Gothenburg municipality announced they would dedicate 11 billion Swedish Krona (about 1 billion euro) towards regenerating the six especially vulnerable areas in the Gothenburg area.

Characteristics 
A vulnerable area is described as being geographically defined and having a low socioeconomic status and criminals negatively affecting society. The three categories of vulnerable area are divided according to severity: vulnerable areas, risk areas and especially vulnerable areas.

These areas are sometimes called no-go areas, as emergency services such as fire engines and ambulances "on occasion" cannot drive into these areas during a tense situation without a police escort as they will be attacked by criminal gangs.

The population in these areas have higher rates of unemployment: whereas about 67% of the general population is in employment, the proportion in vulnerable areas is about 49%.

Most stores and shops are small and run by locals, with few major chains.

According to a 2017 report by Swedish Defence University, of those who have travelled from Sweden to conflict zones to participate in terrorist activities, 70% were residents in vulnerable areas.

According to a 2018 report by Swedish Television, the overall trend is that these areas are improving. Employment rates, income and school results are generally rising.

Vulnerable areas have a low participation in elections: for instance in the Gårdsten district in Gothenburg only a third voted in the 2014 election. Journalists who visited Gårdsten to interview locals on why they didn't vote struggled to complete their task, as many locals they encountered spoke neither Swedish nor English.

By 2018 gang violence, which had long been a feature of vulnerable areas, had begun to spill out into the wider society: hospital staff reported armed confrontations in emergency rooms and school authorities reported that threats and weapons had become commonplace.

Vulnerable area 
An area in the vulnerable category is characterised by a low socioeconomic status; and criminals have a negative impact on society and public institutions. Criminals may use direct threats and blackmail or indirect methods such as public displays of violence which place bystanders at risk of injury or narcotics openly traded in public spaces. The effect of their activities is that inhabitants experience lower levels of security, which may make them less willing to participate or witness in judicial proceedings against criminals.

Risk area 
A risk area fulfills all criteria for a vulnerable area and may become an especially vulnerable area if no interventions are put in. In October 2021 these areas numbered 14.

Especially vulnerable area 
Inhabitants of these areas suffer a potential threat from criminals in the area, which has led to an overall disinclination to participate in judicial proceedings against criminals. In especially vulnerable areas there are systematic threats and violence against witnesses and victims or complainants. These circumstances make it very difficult or impossible for police organisations to complete their mission of law enforcement. In December 2015 these areas numbered 15. In June 2017 this had increased to 23 as some areas were reclassified primarily due to more refined information, not due to a changed situation.

An especially vulnerable area also experience:
 Parallel society structures exercising their own form of justice and control
 Extremism such as systematic violations of freedom of religion or fundamentalism which circumscribe rights and freedoms of the population. According to Magnus Ranstorp in 2017, Salafi jihadism is present in some of these areas. In the especially vulnerable areas there are individuals among the radical Islamic community who contribute to recruitment and financing of Islamic terrorism. These individuals have access to youth via lectures, study groups or as an imam. Some mosques located in or close to these areas may be a contributing factor to radicalisation.
 inhabitants travelling to conflict areas to participate in combat
 a high concentration of criminals.

Employment levels in February 2017 were around 47%. Many inhabitants are immigrants or children of immigrants; in this category the proportion of immigrants in the district is around 50-60%.

In its 2017, police stated that welfare fraud was prevalent in these areas, where benefits administered by Swedish Public Employment Service and the Swedish Social Insurance Agency were targeted. Police identified that resident registry figures were manipulated, for instance 2% of all apartments in Rinkeby have between 10-30 persons registered as residents, which leads to an inflated number of people receiving welfare benefits.

Education level in especially vulnerable areas 
Education levels are lower than the general population in these areas, where 40% of the population has not completed primary education. According to BRÅ statistics, persons with only primary education (Swedish: förgymnasial utbildning) are 5.7 times more likely to be registered for crime compared to persons with post secondary education (Swedish: eftergymnasial utbildning)  On average in 2017, less than half of 15-year-olds in Gothenburg especially vulnerable areas qualified for secondary education. In district Bergsjön, 69.8% of 15-year-olds of Bergsjöskolan left primary education without achieving grades in numeracy and literacy to enter secondary education, the number being 67.3% for the Sjumilaskolan school of Biskopsgården district in Gothenburg compared to the national average of 17.5%. The results were lower compared to five years earlier and interpreted as a worsening trend by researcher Anders Trumberg at Örebro university. A high share of preschool staff in vulnerable areas have lacking Swedish language skills.

Districts 
According to the national operations section (sv: Nationella operativa avdelningen) the districts and their classification are:

Maps

See also 
 Sensitive urban zone - a term for similar areas in France
 Particularly vulnerable public housing area (Denmark)
 No-go area
 Organized crime in Sweden
 Law enforcement in Sweden
 Welfare in Sweden
 Crime in Sweden
 Ghetto

References

Further reading 
 

2010s in Sweden
Crime in Sweden
Housing in Sweden
Poverty in Europe
Social class in Europe
Urban decay in Europe
Urban sociology
Urban studies and planning terminology
Welfare in Sweden
Multiculturalism in Europe